Budda may refer to:

 Budda Baker (born 1996), American National Football League player
 Budda Aruna Reddy (born 1995), Indian artistic gymnast
 Budda Vengal Reddy (1822–1900), Indian philanthropist
 Bud'da, American hip hop producer, songwriter, composer and rapper Stephen Anderson (born 1972)
 Parish of Budda, New South Wales, Australia
 Eremophila duttonii, also known as budda, a flowering plant endemic to Australia
 Budda Amplification, American company that designs and manufactures electric guitar amplifiers and effects pedals

See also
 Gautama Buddha, founder of the religion Buddhism